The 1969 Yukhnov mid-air collision occurred when an Ilyushin Il-14M, operating as Aeroflot Flight 831, a scheduled domestic passenger flight from Moscow-Bykovo Airport to Simferopol Airport, Crimea collided in the air on 23 June 1969 with an Antonov An-12BP of the Soviet Air Force over the Yukhnovsky district of Kaluga Oblast, in the Russian SFSR of the Soviet Union.  All 120 occupants of both aircraft perished in the crash.

Aircraft involved

CCCP-52018 
The aircraft operating Aeroflot Flight 831 was an Ilyushin Il-14M registered CCCP-52018 to the Ukraine division of Aeroflot.  At the time of the accident, the aircraft had 24,653 flight hours. Five crew members and 19 passengers were aboard Flight 831.  The cockpit crew included Captain Georgy Pavlenko and copilot Viktor Pavlovich Buyanov.

Soviet Air Force Antonov An-12BP 
The Antonov An-12 belonging to the Soviet Air Force that was involved in the accident (callsign 08525) was part of a formation of four aircraft demonstrating tactical flight maneuvers to the Minister of Defense, Andrei Grechko.  Two of the aircraft were transporting equipment; the other two, including the one involved in the crash, was carrying paratroopers of the 7th Guards Mountain Air Assault Division. Five flight crew members and 91 paratroopers were aboard the aircraft, all of whom perished in the crash.  The cockpit crew consisted of the following pilots: Major Alexei Ryabtsev, Junior lieutenant Vladimir Priplov, and Captain Nikolai Mikhailovich Maslyuk.

Crash details 
At 13:25 the An-12 involved in the accident (callsign 08525) took off from Kėdainiai Air Base, and was the last one in a formation of four to take off.

At 14:40:55 the crew of Il-14 contacted air traffic control and requested permission to climb to  due to severe turbulence and cumulus clouds.

At 14:52 the two aircraft collided over Yukhnov. The aircraft first struck at the wingtips; then the An-12's nose collided with the right horizontal stabilizer of the Il-14. The An-12 lost the right wing and right wing engines from the impact, causing the aircraft to spin to the ground. The Il-14 lost part of the right wing and the upper part of the fuselage. The An-12 crashed in a field near Vypolzovo village, and the Il-14 crashed near Trinity village. All 120 people aboard both aircraft perished.

Causes 

Memorial 

Vasily Margelov, Commander of the Airborne Forces and General of the Army, decided that a memorial would be constructed in memory of the fallen soldiers.  Money was raised for the construction of a monument to the dead soldiers.  In total, 250 thousand rubles were collected.  A year after the disaster, the memorial was constructed at the site the An-12 crashed.  The monument, designed by Yevgeny Vuchetich, depicts a kneeling mother and paratrooper and contains the inscription: Eternal memory to the heroes-paratroopers and pilots.  Next to the monument is a platform with 96 marble slabs, each with naming a soldier killed in the accident.

At the site of the crashed Ilyushin Il-14 there is a monument to the pilots and passengers.

See also 
 7th Guards Mountain Air Assault Division

References 

Aviation accidents and incidents in the Soviet Union
Aviation accidents and incidents in 1969
Aviation accidents and incidents caused by pilot error
Aeroflot
Accidents and incidents involving the Ilyushin Il-14
Accidents and incidents involving the Antonov An-12
1969 in the Soviet Union
June 1969 events in Europe
Mid-air collisions
Mid-air collisions involving airliners
Mid-air collisions involving military aircraft
Transport in Kaluga Oblast